Leben may refer to:

People
Leben (surname)

Places
Leben (Crete), a town of ancient Crete, Greece

Music
Leben (Schiller album), 2003 studio album by German musician Christopher von Deylen
 Leben… I Feel You, second single from the album
:de:Leben (Album) by Azad (rapper)
"Leben", 1982 song by Katja Ebstein

Other uses
Leben (milk product), a food or beverage of fermented milk